Jean-Pierre Voyer (born 1938, Bolbec) is a post-situationist French philosopher. His main thesis is the non-existence of economy, and he claims to be inspired by Hegel and Marx, although he is very critical of the latter. He criticizes utilitarianism. Jorion has also published in the Revue de Mauss, a French anti-utilitarian journal.

Bibliography 

 Reich, mode d'emploi ("Reich, how to use"), 1971, Champ libre editions (about Wilhelm Reich) (Full text)
 with Jean-Jacques Raspaud : L'internationale situationniste (The Situationist International), 1972, Champ libre
 Introduction à la science de la publicité ("Introduction to the advertising science"), 1975, Champ libre
 Une enquête sur la cause et la nature de la misère des gens ("An investigation into the cause and the nature of the misery of people"), 1976, Champ libre
 Rapport sur l'état des illusions dans notre parti ("Report about the state of the illusions in our party") followed by Révélations sur le principe du monde ("Revelations about the principle of the world"), 1979, Institut de préhistoire contemporaine
 Fin du situationnisme paisible ("End of peaceful situationnism"), 1981, Institut de préhistoire contemporaine
 Revue de préhistoire contemporaine ("Journal of contemporary prehistory") N°1, 1982, Institut de préhistoire contemporaine
 Hécatombe ("Hecatomb"), 1991, La Nuit
 l'Imbécile de Paris ("The imbecile of Paris"), 1995, Éditions anonymes
 Limites de conversation ("Limits of conversation"), 1998, Éditions anonymes
 Diatribe d'un fanatique ("Diatribe of a fanatic" Full text), 2002, Éditions anonymes (about 9/11)

External links 
  Official site

French philosophers
Living people
1938 births
French male non-fiction writers